The men's parallel giant slalom competition of the FIS Freestyle Ski and Snowboarding World Championships 2015 was held at Kreischberg, Austria on January 23 (qualifying and finals).
53 athletes from 20 countries competed.

Results

Qualification
Each participant takes one run on either of the courses. After the first run, only the top 16 are allowed a second run on the opposite course.

Elimination round

References

parallel giant slalom, men's